Barriss may refer to:

 Tyler Barriss, 911 hoax caller in the 2017 Wichita swatting incident
 Barriss Offee, a fictional character in the Star Wars universe

See also
 Barris